The Cincinnati Outlaw Reds were a professional baseball team that played in the Union Association for one season in 1884. The franchise used Bank Street Grounds as their home field. During their only season in existence, the team finished third in the UA with a record of 69–36.

Players

References

External links
Franchise index at Baseball-Reference and Retrosheet

Major League Baseball all-time rosters